Derek Fox (born Sligo, 14 May 1992) is an Irish jockey. He won the 2017 Grand National on One For Arthur.

Major wins
 Great Britain

 Grand National - One For Arthur (2017)
 Mildmay Novices' Chase - Ahoy Senor (2022)
 Sefton Novices' Hurdle - Ahoy Senor (2021)

References

1992 births
Living people
Irish jockeys